Fitchia rapensis is a species of flowering plant in the family Asteraceae. It is found only in French Polynesia.

References

rapensis
Flora of French Polynesia
Least concern plants
Near threatened biota of Oceania
Taxonomy articles created by Polbot
Taxa named by Forest B.H. Brown